Rayleigh test can refer to :
 a test for periodicity in irregularly sampled data.
 a derivation of the above to test for non-uniformity (as unimodal clustering) of a set of points on a circle (eg compass directions). Sometimes known as the Rayleigh z test.

See also
 Circular distribution
 Directional statistics
 Kuiper's test
 Rayleigh distribution
 Watson test

References

External links
 A test for the significance of the mean direction and the concentration parameter of a circular distribution.
 Rao's spacing test - contrasted with Rayleigh test

Theory of probability distributions